Joshua Antonio Torres Bryceland, known as Josh Bryceland, and commonly referred to by his nickname, Ratboy, born 23 March 1990, in Manchester is a professional downhill mountain biker, who lives in Higher Poynton, Cheshire, England.

He entered his first race at 10 .  Andy Kyffin signed him to his Northwest Mountain Bike Centre team.  He won regional and national junior titles. One of his father's friends, Steve Peat signed him to his Royal Racing team.  Bryceland was Junior World Cup Series Champion in 2007 and finished 9th in the Elite Men's race of the Maribor World Cup round. After 2016 he left the Santa Cruz Syndicate team to pursue Enduro racing. Josh has since left the team and is now riding as a Freerider and brand ambassador for Cannondale Cycles.

In 2008 Bryceland followed Peat to the Santa Cruz Syndicate racing team and won the junior world championship in Val di Sole, Italy.

Palmarès

2006
1st  DH, European Mountain Bike Championships - Youth

2007
4th DH, NPS #1 Innerleithen, Scotland - Junior
1st  DH, Dragon Downhill, Welsh Championships, Wales, Series Overall
1st  DH, British National Mountain Biking Championships - Junior
1st  DH, UCI Mountain Bike World Cup, Series Overall - Junior

2008
1st  DH, British National Mountain Biking Championships - Junior
1st  DH, UCI Mountain Bike & Trials World Championships, Val di Sole, Italy - Junior

2011
1st  DH, British National Mountain Biking Rd.3 - Elite
2nd  DH, UCI Mountain Bike World Cup, Mont Saint Anne, Canada - Elite Male

2014
1st  DH, British Cycling National Championships - Senior Male Championship
2nd  DH, UCI Mountain Bike World Cup, Cairns, Australia - Elite Male
1st  DH, UCI Mountain Bike World Cup, Leogang, Austria - Elite Male
2nd  DH, UCI Mountain Bike World Cup, Mont Sainte Anne, Canada - Elite Male
1st  DH, UCI Mountain Bike World Cup, Windham, United States - Elite Male
2nd  DH, UCI Mountain Bike World Championships Hafjell, Norway - Elite Male

See also
Santa Cruz Syndicate

References

External links
Josh Bryceland - official site
Santa Cruz Syndicate - official site
Interview: Josh Bryceland: 2005 NPS Winner on track for 2006, British Cycling, 2006

1990 births
Living people
English male cyclists
Downhill mountain bikers
Sportspeople from Manchester
English mountain bikers